The AltRight Corporation is an alt-right organization based in Alexandria, Virginia. It began operations in January 2017, and runs the website "altright.com".  The site claims to feature "the best writers and analysts" of the alt-right, and lists three founders: Daniel Friberg, Jason Jorjani, and Richard Spencer. Because of the involvement of Friberg and Spencer, the creation of the corporation has been described as "merger of the National Policy Institute, run by American white supremacist Richard Spencer, and an antisemitic Scandinavian media platform." At the time of its formation, it was reported that the corporation had been created in partnership with far-right groups from Sweden. The organization's purpose was reported by NBC News to be to "unite global factions of the so-called alt-right", but it has also been described as intended to create a "more ideological Breitbart [News]".

The Southern Poverty Law Center considers the AltRight Corporation to be a hate group.

Departures
In September 2017, AltRight Corporation co-founder Jason Jorjani claimed that in 2016, funders "very close" to then-presidential candidate Donald Trump, had offered him funding to "infiltrate" the alt-right, with the intention of convincing its leaders to drop their white nationalism rhetoric, and move away from race-based politics, and this is the reason he affiliated himself with Spencer and the alt-right.

Once the AltRightCorporation was founded, after spending months making speeches on behalf of the alt-right and public appearances with Richard Spencer, Jorjani said that influencing the movement was more difficult than he had thought it would be. He resigned from the AltRight Corporation in August 2017, shortly after the violence at the Unite the Right rally in Charlottesville, Virginia. Jorjani has since written the one of the reasons for his leaving was that he "watched the corporation that was my brainchild turn into a magnet for white trash."  He also said that Richard Spencer is "smart in the sense of the word 'smartass.'" and that Spencer had "pretty much destroyed the alt-right brand" by his emphasis on race and "all kinds of other stupidity."

In 2018 Arktos Media, which was co-founded Friberg, announced that it had also departed from the AltRight Corporation. With the departures of Jorjani and Friberg, Richard Spencer was the only co-founder left at the corporation.

In August 2018, Greg Conte, a close ally of Spencer, resigned from multiple Spencer-related positions he held, including one at the AltRight Corporation.

See also
National Policy Institute

References

Alt-right organizations
Companies based in Alexandria, Virginia
2017 establishments in Virginia